Giuseppe De Chirico (11 April 1934 – 15 January 2019) was an Italian sport shooter who competed in the 1968 Summer Olympics, in the 1972 Summer Olympics, and in the 1976 Summer Olympics.

References

1934 births
2019 deaths
Italian male sport shooters
ISSF rifle shooters
Olympic shooters of Italy
Shooters at the 1968 Summer Olympics
Shooters at the 1972 Summer Olympics
Shooters at the 1976 Summer Olympics